is a Japanese production and visual effects studio founded on June 3, 1986, and based in Tokyo. It won the 2008 Academy Award for Best Animated Short Film for La Maison en Petits Cubes.

Productions 
 July 7th, Sunny Day (1996)
 Parasite Eve (1997)
 Juvenile (2000)
 Satorare (2001)
 Returner (2002)
 Always: Sunset on Third Street (2003)
 Bayside Shakedown 2 (2003)
 Zoo Keeper (2003, browser game) 
 Umizaru (2004)
 Fantastipo (2005) 
 Midnight Sun (2006)
 Always: Sunset on Third Street 2 (2007)
 K-20: Legend of the Mask (2008)
 Space Battleship Yamato (2010)
 Wild 7 (2011)
 Always: Sunset on Third Street 3 (2011)
 The Eternal Zero (2013)
 Parasyte: Part 1 (2014)
 Assassination Classroom (2015)
 Parasyte: Part 2 (2015)
 Chihayafuru: Kami no Ku (2016)
 A Man Called Pirate (2016)
 Terra Formars (2016)
 March Comes in Like a Lion (2017)
 Dragon Quest: Your Story (2019)
 Alice in Borderland (2020)
 Untitled Toho Godzilla film (2023) [with Toho Studios]

References

External links 
 
 

Japanese animation studios
Mass media companies established in 1986
Film production companies of Japan
Visual effects companies
Japanese companies established in 1986
Imagica Robot Holdings